Purshevo is the name of several rural localities (villages) in Russia:
Purshevo, Balashikha, Moscow Oblast, a village under the administrative jurisdiction of Balashikha City Under Oblast Jurisdiction in Moscow Oblast
Purshevo, Mozhaysky District, Moscow Oblast, a village in Klementyevskoye Rural Settlement of Mozhaysky District of Moscow Oblast
Purshevo, Pskov Oblast, a village in Opochetsky District of Pskov Oblast
Purshevo, Tver Oblast, a village in Sonkovsky District of Tver Oblast
Purshevo, Yaroslavl Oblast, a village in Prechistensky Rural Okrug of Pervomaysky District of Yaroslavl Oblast